Johann Adam Ackermann (November 3, 1780 – March 27, 1853) was a German landscape painter of the early 19th century.

He was born in Mainz and moved to Frankfurt am Main in 1804. His best-known works are his winter landscapes and watercolours. He died in Frankfurt.

Johann Ackermann was the brother of Georg Friedrich Ackermann (1787, Mainz – 1843, Frankfurt am Main), who also painted landscapes but with less success.

See also
 List of German painters

Sources
 Allgemeine Deutsche Biographie

1780 births
1853 deaths
Artists from Mainz
18th-century German painters
18th-century German male artists
German male painters
19th-century German painters
19th-century German male artists